Acrocercops chionoplecta is a moth of the family Gracillariidae. It is known from New South Wales, Australia.

The larvae feed on Phebalium dentatum. They probably mine the leaves of their host plant.

References

chionoplecta
Moths of Australia
Moths described in 1882